Audinghen (Dutch: Oudinghen) is a commune in the Pas-de-Calais department in the Hauts-de-France region of France.

Geography
Cap Gris-Nez, the nearest part of France to the English coast, forms the western boundary of the commune.

History
The town was originally named Odingehem, 'home of Odin', by the Vikings who built a temple here dedicated to the Germanic god Odin. Audinghen has been rebuilt several times after being completely destroyed, including:
 In 1643 or 1644, according to the interpretations, by a party of soldiers of the King of England, who burned the village population inside the church;
 Three centuries later, in November 1943, by the British, who bombed and totally destroyed the village (then occupied by the German army) and a centre for Organisation Todt.

Population

Sights
 The church of St. Pierre, dating from the twentieth century.
 The ruins of the lighthouse at Cap Gris Nez.
 World War II German defences, part of the Atlantic wall.

Personalities
 Gabriel Auguste Ferdinand Ducuing, soldier who died here in 1940.
 Raoul de Godewaersvelde, composer, died here in 1977.

See also
Communes of the Pas-de-Calais department

References

External links

 Website about Audinghen 

Communes of Pas-de-Calais